Countess Louise Augusta zu Stolberg-Stolberg (7 January 1753 in Bramstedt, Duchy of Holstein30 May 1835 in Kiel) is known for her lively correspondence with the poet and thinker Johann Wolfgang von Goethe; she is known as Goethes Gustchen in the history of literature. By birth she was member of the House of Stolberg and by marriage member of House of Bernstorff.

Early life
She was daughter of Count Christian Günther zu Stolberg-Stolberg (1714–1765) and Countess Christiane Charlotte zu Castell-Remlingen (1722–1773). She was younger sister of Goethe's friends Count Friedrich Leopold zu Stolberg-Stolberg ("Fritz") and Count Christian zu Stolberg-Stolberg.

Later life
She lived in a pension for young, unmarried noble girls from 1770 to 1783 along with the older Baroness Metta von Oberg. Her letters to the young Goethe date to 1775 and 1776. They never met in person.

In all her correspondence she was a lively writer. "Augusta – vom Morgen bis in Abend laufen die Depeschen bey ihr ein, wie bey einem Staatsminister, und werden sorgfältiger abgefertigt, als in einer Canzelley"	
noted Friedrich Gottlieb Klopstock.

Marriage
On 7 August 1783 Augusta Louise moved to Copenhagen, and later married the Danish Minister of State Count Andreas Peter von Bernstorff. They had no issue.

Sources
 Plath-Langheinrich, Elsa: Als Goethe nach Uetersen schrieb: Das Leben der Conventualin Augusta Louise Gräfin zu Stolberg-Stolberg.  (de)
 Koopmann, Helmut: Goethe und Frau von Stein.  (de)
 Goethe an Auguste Gräfin zu Stolberg, [Frankfurt, January 18.- 30. 1775]. (de)

External links
 Brief biography and excerpts of Goethe, also with Gustchen(de)
 Biographical Highlights: Auguste Louise, Gräfin zu Stolberg-Stolberg (de)

1753 births
1835 deaths
German letter writers
Women letter writers
German philosophers
Augusta Louise
People from Bad Bramstedt
People from the Duchy of Holstein